Mahbub Uz Zaman ia a Bangladesh diplomat and Ambassador of Bangladesh to China. He is the former Secretary (Asia and Pacific) at the Ministry of Foreign Affairs. His is the former High Commissioner of Bangladesh to Sri Lanka and Singapore.

Early life 
Zaman has masters in economics from the University of Dhaka.

Career 
Zaman joined the Foreign Service cadre of the Bangladesh Civil Service in 1985. He had served in the Permanent Mission of Bangladesh to the United Nations and Permanent Mission of Bangladesh to the United Nations in Vienna.

Zaman was the director of administration at the Ministry of Foreign Affairs. He was the director of Multilateral Economic Affairs. Zaman had served in the High Commission of Bangladesh to Canada. He had served in the embassy of Bangladesh in Japan. He was the Director General South Asia and South Asian Association for Regional Cooperation at the Ministry of Foreign Affairs in 2006. He was the High Commissioner of Bangladesh to Sri Lanka in November 2011.

Zaman was appointed the High Commissioner of Bangladesh to Singapore in 2012. He replaced Kamrul Ahsan. He asked workers in Singapore to remain calm following the 2013 Little India riot. During his term Zika Virus spread to expatriate Bangladeshi community in Singapore in 2016.

From 2016 to 2019, Zaman was the secretary in charge of Asia and Pacific region at the Ministry of Foreign Affairs. In August 2017, he met a representative of the government of Myanmar to discuss the influx of Rohingya Refugees in Bangladesh.

On 21 August 2019, Zaman was appointed the ambassador of Bangladesh to China for one year. His appointment was extended by one year in 2020.

In June 2022, Zaman hosted the Director General of the Department of Asian Affairs who called Bangladesh to reject "cold war mentality" of the United States.

References 

Living people
Bangladeshi civil servants
High Commissioners of Bangladesh to Sri Lanka
High Commissioners of Bangladesh to Singapore
Ambassadors of Bangladesh to China
University of Dhaka alumni
Bangladeshi diplomats
Year of birth missing (living people)